Surkh Chandni is a 2019 Pakistani crime-drama television series, produced by Humayun Saeed, Shahzad Nasib, Samina Humayun Saeed and Sana Shahnawaz under the production banners Six Sigma Plus and Next Level Entertainment. It is directed by Shahid Shafaat and written by Asma Nabeel. First episode of the series aired on 11 June 2019 on ARY Digital and last episode aired on 24 September 2019.

It focuses on the subject of Acid throwing with Sohai Ali Abro as Aida, an acid attack survivor and Asad Siddiqui as the perpetrator. It also has Osman Khalid Butt as Aida's love interest and Mansha Pasha as Aida's sister-in-law (antagonist).

Plot 

The story starts with Aida who loves her cousin Amaan and he loves her also and they both want marry each other. However, Jawad, a guy from the neighborhood of Aida sends his proposal for marriage to Adia's home which she rejects. There comes Amaan with his mother and decide to marry earlier due to this incident to which the family agrees. On the other hand, Jawad in a fit of furry doesn't accept that Aida has rejected his proposal and decides to take revenge. He makes a plan and incorporate Aadia's sister-in-law Shumaila in it. He says Shumaila to bring her in beauty parlour on her wedding day and throws acid on her from returning.

One side of her face burns completely and is admitted to the hospital. Amaan and his mother takes full care of her and supports her. Jawad worries about the revealing of his name as a preparator but pulls Shumaila on his side as she was the only who had seen the attacker. He fulfills her desires which she couldn't due to poverty.

After discharging from hospital, Adia returns home and everyone in her neighbourhood blames her and even her brother Mukhtar also doesn't believe her when her character is questioned. She tells her mother that Jawad has done this and forbids her to tell it to anyone but she tells it to Amaan who decides to bring his end but fails as they lost case in the court due to lack of preparation and Shumaila's deception, who gives witness against Aida which undermines her honour further.

Cast
 Sohai Ali Abro as Aida
 Osman Khalid Butt as Amaan
 Hassan Ahmed as Mukhtar
 Mansha Pasha as Shumaila
 Asad Siddiqui as Jawad
 Huma Nawab as Safina; Amaan's mother
 Rashid Farooqui as Badar; Aida's father
 Lubna Aslam as Rukhsana; Aida's mother
 Gul-e-Rana as Humaira; Jawad's mother
 Rashida Tabbasum as Rehana, a social worker
 Hajra Khan as Aida's lawyer
 Saleem Mairaj as Jawad's lawyer

Reception 

In an article by Dawn Images, the reviewer praised powerful moments, chemistry of the lead couple and finale of the series for sensitively dealing the issue of acid attacks, however criticised the pace. Express Tribune lauded the direction of Shafaat for portraying the realistic journey of the survivor, performances of the cast members and Nabeel's script. Hareem Zafar of Youline Magazine praised the Abro and Butt's performances and raw and realistic depiction of the household.

Accolades

References

2019 Pakistani television series debuts
Pakistani drama television series
Urdu-language television shows
ARY Digital original programming